Rado (died 1057) was a noble in the Kingdom of Hungary, who served as palatine around 1057, during the reign of Andrew I of Hungary.

As palatine, Rado donated some land estates to the Abbey of Szávaszentdemeter (today Sremska Mitrovica, Serbia) in 1057. He died in that same year. Later his widow, Lucia commemorated her orphaned relatives in a charter.

His name is Slavic. It is possible that Rado was a descendant of Gabriel Radomir, a son of Bulgar Emperor Samuel (r. 997–1014).

References

Sources
 
 
 

1057 deaths
Palatines of Hungary
Year of birth unknown
History of Syrmia
11th century in Serbia
11th-century Hungarian people